Chapel Point State Park is an undeveloped public recreation area located on the Port Tobacco River, a tributary of the Potomac, in Charles County, Maryland. The state park offers fishing and hunting. Adjacent to the park, St. Ignatius Church and cemetery, the oldest continuous Roman Catholic parish in the United States, offers a scenic river view.

History
In the early 20th century, Chapel Point had an amusement park with facilities for roller skating and social functions and played host to the first Charles County Fair. The property, which had been Jesuit land since it was patented in 1638, was acquired from the Corporation of Roman Catholic Clergymen by the Maryland Department of Natural Resources in 1972.

References

External links

Chapel Point State Park Maryland Department of Natural Resources
Chapel Point State Park Map Maryland Department of Natural Resources

State parks of Maryland
Parks in Charles County, Maryland
Protected areas established in 1972